The Burkholderiaceae are a family of bacteria included in the order Burkholderiales. It includes some pathogenic species, such as Burkholderia mallei (glanders) and Burkholderia pseudomallei (melioidosis).

References

External links

 J.P. Euzéby: List of Prokaryotic names with Standing in Nomenclature

 
Burkholderiales
Bacteria families